Eydarshan (also Romanized as Eydarshān; also known as Eydīrshān) is a village in Howmeh Rural District, in the Central District of Sarab County, East Azerbaijan Province, Iran. At the 2006 census, its population was 144, in 36 families.

References 

Populated places in Sarab County